Fatma Özlem Tursun (born March 29, 1988) is a Turkish female football referee and former women's footballer.

Sports career

Player
Fatma Özlem Tursun began her playing career in her hometown club Konak Belediyespor in the 2008–09 season after obtaining her license on October 27, 2010. She appeared in 44 matches of the First League and scored two goals until the end of the 2010–11 season.

Referee
Tursun began her referee career debuting in the Regional Boys under-17 Development League on October 27, 2013, as fourth official.

On November 10, 2013, she was appointed to officiate a Women's Second League match as second assistant referee. She was also in charge of first and second assistant referee roles in various regional leagues for the age categories of boys' U-14, U-15, U-16, U-17 and men's U-19, U-21 and Turkish Regional Amateur League as well as in Women's Third and Second League.

She debuted as referee in a regional boys' U-14 league match on March 8, 2014. After officiating matches as referee in the regional boys' U-15 league and Women's Third League, Tursun was tasked in a ||Women's First League match of the 2015–16 season on November 7, 2015.

In November 2015, Tursun was nominated by the Turkish Football Federation a FIFA listed official for international futsal matches in 2016.

Player career statistics

Honours
 Turkish Women's First League
 Konak Belediyespor
 Runners-up (1): 2010–11

References

Living people
1988 births
Footballers from İzmir
Sportspeople from İzmir
Turkish women's footballers
Konak Belediyespor players
Turkish football referees
Turkish women referees and umpires
Futsal referees
Women association football referees
Women's association footballers not categorized by position